Aucaleuc (Gallo: Laugaloec) is a commune in the Côtes-d'Armor department of Brittany in north-western France.

Population

The inhabitants of Aucaleuc are known as Aucaleuens in French.

See also
Communes of the Côtes-d'Armor department

References

Communes of Côtes-d'Armor